George McGregor was a Scottish professional footballer who played as an inside forward for Sunderland.

References

People from Saltcoats
Scottish footballers
Association football inside forwards
Saltcoats Victoria F.C. players
St Mirren F.C. players
Sunderland A.F.C. players
Benburb F.C. players
English Football League players